Block by Block is a 2013 Indian documentary film produced by Vidhi Kasliwal. A Landmarc Films production and presentation, it is directed by Hina Sayada. It explores the experiences of the construction laborers who built Palais Royale, Mumbai, the tallest building in India.

Cast
This film was released in English, Hindi and Marathi languages, known as Saathi Haath Badhana in non-English versions. While the English and Hindi versions have Raj Zutshi as the narrator, the Marathi version was narrated by Sachin Khedekar.

Accolades
Block by Block won Best Background Music at the 4th Kolkata Short International Film Festival, Best Cinematography at the 4th Delhi Short International Film Festival, Special Jury Mention at the 3rd Indian Cine Film Festival, and the Official Selection at the 4th Bangalore Shorts Film Festival and many more.

References

External links
 

Indian documentary films